Gyri Tove Sørensen (born 12 June 1951) is a Norwegian alpine skier. She was born in Oslo. She participated at the 1972 Winter Olympics in Sapporo, where she competed in slalom, giant slalom and downhill.

She became Norwegian champion in slalom in 1972.

References

External links

 

1951 births
Living people
Alpine skiers from Oslo
Norwegian female alpine skiers
Olympic alpine skiers of Norway
Alpine skiers at the 1972 Winter Olympics